Abdulrahman Saleh (born 3 June 1999) is an Emirati footballer. He currently plays as a left back  for Al-Wasl.

External links

References

Emirati footballers
1999 births
Living people
Al-Wasl F.C. players
Place of birth missing (living people)
UAE Pro League players
Association football fullbacks